Raajkumar Aaryyan is an Indian television soap opera starring Yami Gautam. Produced by Sphere Origins and its first broadcast in January 2008, it is part of a package of shows supporting the launch of NDTV's new Imagine channel. The series became one of Imagine's top ranking programmes in terms of viewership.

Cast 
Anirudh Dave as Raajkumar Aaryyan
Avinash Mukherjee as Young Raajkumar Aaryyan
Yami Gautam  as Rajkumari Bhairvi           
Avika Gor as Young  Rajkumari Bhairvi
Manish Wadhwa as Bhootnath
Nirmal Pandey as Senapati Bhujang
Shahbaaz Khan as Hussain Baba
Aditi Sajwan as Mayasheen

References

External links 
Official Site

Indian fantasy television series
2008 Indian television series debuts